Shatterling is a scattered hamlet located along the A257 road about two miles (3.2 km) east of Wingham in the Dover district of Kent, England. The population of the hamlet is included within the civil parish of Staple.

Dover District